ManaTapu is a music group from Malta formed in 2012. The band consists at this date of Dario Vella C (vocals, lead guitar), Ryan Abela (drums), Pupa Chile (MC, vocals), Tete a.k.a. Camacho Criminal (MC, vocals), James Saliba (bass guitar), Luca Gurrieri (Saxophone), Liksu (trumpet, keyboard).
 
Initially rooted in reggae and ska, ManaTapu "also draws inspiration from a host of other sounds and genres that run the gamut from funk to blues", rock music to folk, popular music to polka, and even, hip-hop to punk rock. Collectively, the band speaks about 5 languages. With lyrics which range from English, to Maltese, to Spanish and French, the band cites its multicultural influences as a core element of the ManaTapu sound.

Known to  "generate massive audience reaction when they play live", ManaTapu are "one of the most sought-after live acts on the island" of Malta. This live energy was captured in their music video for song music video for song Kanta r Rima, filmed during the band's  "headlining show at the 2014 Sliema Street Art Festival".

Band name

The group's name is inspired by, and composed of two separate words, Mana and Tapu, which are found in Māori tradition and culture. 'Mana' is a word found in Austronesian languages translating to "power, effectiveness, prestige"  often with supernatural and magical connotations. 'Tapu' is closely linked to the Māori concept of mana (respect / authority) and many view tapu as the mana derived from the gods. As the New Zealand Ministry of Justice puts it:

Mana and tapu are concepts which have both been attributed single-worded definitions by contemporary writers. As concepts, especially Maori concepts they can not easily be translated into a single English definition. Both mana and tapu take on a whole range of related meanings depending on their association and the context in which they are being used.

History
Prior to ManaTapu's formation, founding members Dario Vella C, and Francesco Darmanin had played in a band called I'n'I. It was in the summer months of 2010, at a reggae bar in St-Julians called "Juuls", that Dario and Francesco would meet Jogy and Pupa Chile, and begin playing music together under the 'ManaTapu' name. The foursome met Tete in Summer 2011, at a jam session at bar / venue Ta Fra Ben, in a Maltese town called Buġibba. In October 2012, the band would meet Andrew McGrath, ex drummer for Montreal punk rock group Humanifesto, and ask him to join the group.
Francesco decided to leave the band in 2016 so Aaron replaced him until James Saliba took over in April 2019, also the drummer Andrew McGrath have been replaced by Ryan Abela in 2018. After the first Europe Tour 2019 that took place in june - july 2019 in Italy, Germany, Austria, Czech Republic, the members of the band decided to parting ways with Jogy Bo, due to personal issues.
The band is now ready for new adventure & new music, "what began as fun acoustic jams on Malta’s beaches in the summer of 2012 gradually turned into ManaTapu."

Discography
Timpana (2013)
TuaTara (2018)

See also
 Music of Malta

References

External links
 ManaTapu Official website
 Review of Timpana EP

Maltese musical groups